Johannes Arnoldus "John" Jorritsma (born 16 September 1956) is a Dutch politician serving as Mayor of Eindhoven from 13 September 2016 to 13 September 2022, and succeeded by Jeroen Dijsselbloem (PvdA). A member of the People's Party for Freedom and Democracy (VVD), he previously was the King's Commissioner of the province of Friesland between 16 May 2008 and 12 September 2016.

A native of Bolsward, Jorritsma was a member of the States of North Brabant from 1994 to 1998 and Mayor of Cranendonck between 1997 and 2002.

References

1956 births
Living people
20th-century Dutch civil servants
King's and Queen's Commissioners of Friesland
Mayors in North Brabant
Mayors of Eindhoven
Members of the Provincial Council of North Brabant
People from Bolsward
People's Party for Freedom and Democracy politicians